Aulis Kallakorpi (1 January 1929 in Kuusankoski – 15 May 2005 in Mikkeli) was a Finnish ski jumper. He won a silver medal in the Individual large hill event at the 1956 Winter Olympics.

Kallakorpi also won the ski jumping event at the Holmenkollen ski festival in 1955.

External links
 
 
  - click Vinnere for downloadable pdf file 

1929 births
2005 deaths
People from Kuusankoski
Ski jumpers at the 1956 Winter Olympics
Finnish male ski jumpers
Holmenkollen Ski Festival winners
Olympic ski jumpers of Finland
Olympic silver medalists for Finland
Olympic medalists in ski jumping
Medalists at the 1956 Winter Olympics
Sportspeople from Kymenlaakso
20th-century Finnish people